The electoral district of Clarinda is an electoral district of the Victorian Legislative Assembly in Australia. It was created in the redistribution of electoral boundaries in 2013, and came into effect at the 2014 state election.

It largely covers the area of the abolished district of Clayton, covering south east suburbs in Melbourne. It includes the suburbs of Clarinda, Clayton, Springvale, Heatherton and Cheltenham.

The abolished district of Clayton was held by Labor MP Hong Lim, who retained the new seat at the 2014 election.

Members

Election results

Graphical summary

References

External links
 District profile from the Victorian Electoral Commission

Clarinda, Electoral district of
2014 establishments in Australia
City of Kingston (Victoria)
City of Greater Dandenong
Electoral districts and divisions of Greater Melbourne